USS Miller (FF-1091), originally (DE-1091) was a  destroyer escort in the United States Navy. She was named for Cook Third Class Doris "Dorie" Miller, who was awarded the Navy Cross for his actions at the attack on Pearl Harbor.

Design and description
The Knox-class design was derived from the  modified to extend range and without a long-range missile system. They displacement  at full load. Their crew consisted of 13 officers and 211 enlisted men.

The ships were equipped with one Westinghouse geared steam turbine that drove the single propeller shaft.

The Knox-class ships were armed with a 5"/54 caliber Mark 42 gun forward and a single 3-inch/50-caliber gun aft. They mounted an eight-round RUR-5 ASROC launcher between the 5-inch (127 mm) gun and the bridge. Close-range anti-submarine defense was provided by two twin  Mk 32 torpedo tubes. The ships were equipped with a torpedo-carrying DASH drone helicopter; its telescoping hangar and landing pad were positioned amidships aft of the mack. Beginning in the 1970s, the DASH was replaced by a SH-2 Seasprite LAMPS I helicopter and the hangar and landing deck were accordingly enlarged. Most ships also had the 3-inch (76 mm) gun replaced by an eight-cell BPDMS missile launcher in the early 1970s.

Construction and career 

Miller was built at Avondale, Louisiana. Commissioned in June 1973, her active service was performed with the Atlantic Fleet, including deployments to the Mediterranean, Northern Europe, the Persian Gulf and the Black Sea. In July 1975, she was reclassified as a frigate and redesignated FF-1091. Miller transferred to the Naval Reserve Force in January 1982, based in Newport, Rhode Island, and thereafter was employed in the western Atlantic and Caribbean areas. She decommissioned in October 1991 and was stricken from the Naval Vessel Register in 1995. In 1999 she was transferred to Turkey as a hulk and in 2001 was sunk as a target in a Turkish naval exercise.

Notes

References

External links

 Navsource Online: Destroyer Escort Photo Archive : USS Miller (DE 1091)
 USS Miller (DE 1091) website

 

Knox-class frigates
Ships built in Bridge City, Louisiana
1972 ships
Ships transferred from the United States Navy to the Turkish Navy
Ships sunk as targets
Cold War frigates and destroyer escorts of the United States